Buchnera may refer to:
 Buchnera (bacterium), a genus of proteobacteria
 Buchnera (plant), a plant genus from the family Orobanchaceae